Wilson G. Bradshaw was the third president of Florida Gulf Coast University.

A native of Sanford, Florida and raised in West Palm Beach, Wilson Bradshaw holds bachelor's and master's degrees in psychology from Florida Atlantic University and a doctorate in psychobiology from the University of Pittsburgh. He is married to Jo Anna and they have three adult sons.

Bradshaw came to FGCU from Metropolitan State University in St. Paul, Minnesota, having previously served as its president for seven years. Prior to that he served as provost and Vice President of Academic Affairs at Bloomsburg University and Dean of Graduate Studies at Florida Atlantic University.

Bradshaw became FGCU president on August 25, 2007, replacing Bill Merwin who resigned after admitting to an extramarital affair with a faculty member.

References

Living people
Heads of universities and colleges in the United States
Florida Atlantic University alumni
Florida Gulf Coast University
Palm Beach State College alumni
University of Pittsburgh alumni
1946 births
People from Sanford, Florida
People from West Palm Beach, Florida
People from Estero, Florida